Luigi Del Bianco (May 8, 1892 - January 20, 1969) was an Italian-American sculptor, and chief carver of Mount Rushmore.

Early life and education 
Bianco was born on a ship near Le Havre, France, on May 8, 1892, to Vincenzo and Osvalda Del Bianco, who were returning from the United States to Italy. He showed interest in carving at a young age, and spent time in Austria and Venice studying the art.

Career 
When Bianco was 18 years old, he left for America, arriving in Barre, Vermont. 

When World War I broke out, Bianco returned to Italy and fought for his home country, eventually returning to Vermont in 1920. Bianco's brother-in-law introduced him to Mount Rushmore designer Gutzon Borglum, and Bianco began working at Borglum's studio.

In 1933, Borglum hired Bianco as chief stone carver on the Mount Rushmore National Memorial. Paid $1.50 an hour, Bianco was charged with carving the detail in the faces. He carved Abraham Lincoln's eyes, and patched a dangerous crack in Thomas Jefferson's lip.

Borglum constantly praised Bianco for his great abilities as a classically trained stone carver: "He is worth any three men in America for this particular type of work." "He is the only intelligent, efficient stone carver on the work who understands the language of the sculptor." "We could double our progress if we had two like Bianco."

Before Mount Rushmore Bianco worked on Stone Mountain and Wars of America memorial with Borglum.

On September 16, 2017, the National Park Service unveiled a memorial plaque at Mount Rushmore. The plaque acknowledged Luigi Del Bianco's crucial role as the only chief carver on the work.

References

Further reading

Italian male sculptors
Mount Rushmore
1892 births
1969 deaths
20th-century American male artists
20th-century American sculptors
20th-century Italian male artists
20th-century Italian sculptors
Italian emigrants to the United States
American people of Italian descent
People with acquired American citizenship
American male sculptors
People born at sea